"Kisses of Fire" is a song recorded by Swedish pop group ABBA, released on their 1979 album Voulez-Vous.

Production and release
On 22 January 1979, Björn Ulvaeus and Benny Andersson went abroad to the Bahamas on a working trip to write new songs. They came up with up to four songs on this trip, one of which was given the working title of "Tidemas Blåsning" and released as "Kisses Of Fire".

The track was recorded at Polar Studios in Stockholm, Sweden, on 7 February 1979, and mixed on 1 March 1979.

"Kisses of Fire" was released as the B-side to the single "Does Your Mother Know" in April 1979, shortly before the release of the Voulez-Vous album. The single peaked outside the UK top 3, possibly as a consequence of the lead vocals in "Does Your Mother Know" being sung by Björn rather than Agnetha or Frida. "Kisses of Fire" was considered to  be a much more typical ABBA track.

The song was featured in Mamma Mia! Here We Go Again, performed by Panos Mouzourakis.

References

Songs about kissing
1979 songs
ABBA songs